Max Laich (fl. 1908–1910) was a Swiss professional footballer, who played as a midfielder, and football referee. He joined Italian club Milan in 1908. However, his footballing career was halted by a serious leg injury, which he suffered during an exhibition game against Internazionale, on 20 May 1909.

References

External links 
Profile at MagliaRossonera.it 

Year of birth missing
Year of death missing
Swiss men's footballers
Swiss expatriate footballers
Swiss expatriate sportspeople in Italy
Swiss football referees
Association football midfielders
A.C. Milan players